Mirko Taccola (born 18 April 1970 in Pisa, Italy) is an Italian former professional footballer who played as a defender. He represented Italy at the 1992 Summer Olympics.

External links
 Mirko Taccola's profile on San Marino Calcio's official website

1970 births
Sportspeople from Pisa
Association football defenders
Italian footballers
Italian expatriate footballers
Living people
Olympic footballers of Italy
Footballers at the 1992 Summer Olympics
Pisa S.C. players
Ternana Calcio players
Delfino Pescara 1936 players
Inter Milan players
S.S. Virtus Lanciano 1924 players
S.S.D. Lucchese 1905 players
Palermo F.C. players
S.S.C. Napoli players
Cagliari Calcio players
PAOK FC players
A.S.D. Victor San Marino players
Potenza S.C. players
Serie A players
Serie B players
Super League Greece players
Expatriate footballers in Greece
Italian expatriate sportspeople in Greece
Footballers from Tuscany